Eden Studios may refer to:
 Eden Studios, a commercial recording facility in west London
 Eden Studios, Inc., a table top role-playing game developing company
 Eden Games, a French video game design and development company created in 1998 which was known by the name Eden Studios until 2003